Rehana Siddiqui was a Pakistani actress.  She was known for her roles in dramas Zameen, Fasad Ki Jar, Takmeel, Machalay Ka Sauda, Saat Bhiraie and Barson Baad.

Early life 
She was born in 1940 Shimla, British India and her father named Nazir Ahmad was a government servant.

Career 
Rehana started working at Radio Pakistan in 1962 and before joining Radio she used to write short stories for newspaper and magazines using her pen name Rehana Zeerat. She made her debut as an actress in 1964 when PTV was newly establish. She was noted for her roles in dramas Fasad Ki Jar, Shama Har Rang Main Jalti Hai, Zameen, Kuch Tou Kaho, Takmeel and Kallo. She also appeared in dramas Saat Bhiraie, Aadhi Roti Aik Langoti, Tanha and Gohra Gass Ka Ta Hai. She also did theatre and stage plays at Lahore. She also worked in Urdu and Punjabi films and appeared in films Bahu Rani, Aanch, Hamdam, Agg Tay Khoon and Mohabbat Rang Laye Gi. For her contributions towards the Radio, Television and Film industry, she was honored by the Government of Pakistan with the Pride of Performance in 2009.

Later in late 2012 she retired and went to live with one of her daughter at Blackburn at United Kingdom.

Personal life 
She married film actor Aurangzeb but later they divorced and she took the custody of her two daughters and her elder sister Talat Siddiqui was also an actress. Rehana's nieces Fariha Pervez and Arifa Siddiqui are both singers and Nahid Siddiqui is a famous dancer.

Illness and death 
She contracted a prolonged illness from which she died in Blackburn, United Kingdom at age 81.

Filmography

Television

Telefilm

Film

Other appearance

Awards and recognition

References

External links
 

1940 births
20th-century Pakistani actresses
Pakistani film actresses
21st-century Pakistani actresses
Pakistani stage actresses
Actresses in Pashto cinema
Pakistani television actresses
Pakistani radio personalities
Actresses in Punjabi cinema
Radio personalities from Lahore
2021 deaths
Actresses in Urdu cinema
Recipients of the Pride of Performance